James Monroe Goggin (October 23, 1820 – October 10, 1889) was a Confederate States Army major and Assistant Adjutant General during the American Civil War (Civil War). He began his service as a major in the 32nd Virginia Volunteer Infantry Regiment until May 21, 1862.  Although he was a staff officer for most of the rest of his war service, he commanded a brigade at the Battle of Cedar Creek on October 13, 1864. On December 4, 1864, he was appointed as a (special) brigadier general. The appointment was soon cancelled and he returned to his duties as a staff officer for Major General Joseph B. Kershaw for the remainder of the war.

Early life and Texas
James Monroe Goggin was born on October 23, 1820 in Bedford County, Virginia. He was married to Elizabeth Nelson Page.

Goggin entered the United States Military Academy at West Point, New York in the Class of 1842 but left before graduating. After leaving West Point, Goggin relocated to Texas, where he joined the Army of the Republic of Texas as a first lieutenant. Goggin also began purchasing real estate in Waller County, Texas.

In 1848, Goggin moved to California where he took a job establishing mail routes. Goggin then moved to Memphis, Tennessee, where he began working as a cotton broker. He was engaged in this business until the beginning of the Civil War.

Civil War service
In 1861, Goggin moved back to Virginia, entering the Confederate States Army on July 1, 1861 as a major in the 32nd Virginia Volunteer Infantry Regiment where he was assigned to lead a battalion. Goggin and the 32nd Virginia Infantry served under Maj. Gen. John B. Magruder in 1861 and into 1862 during the Peninsula Campaign. Goggin joined the First Corps, Army of Northern Virginia in April 1862, serving on the staff of Maj. Gen. Lafayette McLaws as his assistant adjutant general. He served in this capacity during all of the First Corps' engagements, in both the Army of Northern Virginia and the Army of Tennessee, until the spring of 1864. During the Battle of Fort Sanders in November 1863, Goggin carried a message from McLaws to Lt. Gen. James Longstreet, informing him that the attack was beginning to fail and it was futile to carry in on. When McLaws was replaced with Maj. Gen. Joseph B. Kershaw in May 1864, Goggin served as his assistant adjutant general as well. His service in this post was highly praised by Goggin's superiors.

On October 13, 1864, during the Battle of Cedar Creek in the Valley Campaigns of 1864, Goggin was given temporary command of Brig. Gen. James Conner's brigade. Conner had lost his left leg in combat earlier that day, and Kershaw assigned Goggin to lead his brigade in the battle at Cedar Creek. On December 4 he was appointed a "special" brigadier general, but this appointment was canceled soon afterwards.

Goggin returned to the staff of Kershaw in December 1864, once again as assistant adjutant general, and served until Goggin, Kershaw, and the rest of the staff were captured on April 6, 1865 at the Battle of Sayler's Creek during the Appomattox Campaign. They were paroled from that location on the same day.

Postbellum
After the American Civil War ended in 1865, Goggin returned to Texas, initially in the state's Waller County, and then in Austin. James Monroe Goggin died at the age of 68 on October 10, 1889 in Austin, Texas. He was buried in the city's Oakwood Cemetery.

See also

List of American Civil War Generals (Acting Confederate)

Notes

References
 "Campbell Chronicles and Family Sketches - Goggin"> 
 Eicher, John H., and David J. Eicher, Civil War High Commands. Stanford: Stanford University Press, 2001. .
 Sifakis, Stewart. Who Was Who in the Civil War. New York: Facts On File, 1988. .
 Warner, Ezra J. Generals in Gray: Lives of the Confederate Commanders. Baton Rouge: Louisiana State University Press, 1959. .
 Wert, Jeffry D. General James Longstreet: The Confederacy's Most Controversial Soldier: A Biography. New York: Simon & Schuster, 1993. .
 Wright, Marcus J., General Officers of the Confederate Army, J. M. Carroll & Co., 1983. .

1820 births
1889 deaths
People from Bedford County, Virginia
Confederate States Army officers
People of Virginia in the American Civil War
People of Texas in the American Civil War
United States Military Academy alumni